Tanymecosticta is a genus of damselflies in the family Isostictidae. There are about six described species in Tanymecosticta.

Species
These six species belong to the genus Tanymecosticta:
 Tanymecosticta capillaris Lieftinck, 1959
 Tanymecosticta filiformis (Ris, 1898)
 Tanymecosticta fissicollis (Lieftinck, 1932)
 Tanymecosticta jejuna Lieftinck, 1959
 Tanymecosticta leptalea Lieftinck, 1959
 Tanymecosticta simonae Lieftinck, 1969

References

Further reading

 
 
 

Isostictidae
Articles created by Qbugbot